The Hirayama Ikuo Silk Road Museum is a Japanese museum named after the painter and collector Ikuo Hirayama.

The museum opened in 2004 in the Yamanashi region of Japan. It is one of the few and significant museums about the Silk Road, to be located outside of China.

Many of the objects of the collection were exhibited in China in 2018–2019.

References

Museums in Yamanashi Prefecture
2004 establishments in Japan
Hokuto, Yamanashi
Museums established in 2004
Silk Road